Gu Xiangbing (born February 1959) is a vice admiral (zhongjiang) of the People's Liberation Army (PLA), serving as deputy commander of the Eastern Theater Command since January 2016. He is a delegate to the 13th National People's Congress.

Biography
Gu was born in Qidong County, Jiangsu, in February 1959. He enlisted in the People's Liberation Army in 1978. In December 2008, he rose to become deputy chief of staff of the North Sea Fleet. In July 2011, he became deputy commander of the East Sea Fleet, and held that office until January 2016, when he was commissioned as deputy commander of the Eastern Theater Command.

He was promoted to the rank of rear admiral (Shaojiang) in July 2010 and vice admiral (zhongjiang) in July 2017.

References

1959 births
Living people
People from Qidong, Jiangsu
People's Liberation Army generals from Jiangsu
People's Republic of China politicians from Jiangsu
Chinese Communist Party politicians from Jiangsu
Delegates to the 13th National People's Congress